Joseph E. Robach  (born February 22, 1958) is an American politician who was a member of the New York Senate, representing the 56th district from 2003 until 2020. The district includes portions of Rochester, New York and the surrounding communities.

A Republican, Robach formerly served in the New York State Assembly as a Democrat from 1991 to 2002.

Background
Robach was born on February 22, 1958, the son of Assemblyman Roger J. Robach (1934–1991) and Teresa Fallocco. He graduated from Aquinas Institute and the State University of New York College at Brockport, where he received his Bachelor of Science and Master of Public Administration degrees.

In 1991, Robach entered politics as a Democrat, and was elected to the New York State Assembly in a special election in November of that year to the seat vacated by the death of his father. As an Assemblyman, Robach often had the support of the Conservative Party of New York State. He would serve in the Assembly until 2002.

In 2011, Robach voted against the Marriage Equality Act allowing same-sex marriage in New York, although the Act passed in a narrow 33-29 vote.

In 2018, Robach weighed running for the United States House of Representatives to succeed Louise Slaughter, who had died. He ultimately decided not to run.

New York Senate 
In 2002, Robach switched parties to become a Republican. In lieu of running for another term in the Assembly, he opted to run for the New York State Senate, where he defeated Harry Bronson 66% to 33%. Since his initial election, Robach has never faced serious opposition, with an exception in 2008, when he narrowly defeated Richard A. Dollinger 52% to 48%.

Despite the district being overwhelmingly Democratic by voter registration, Robach was unopposed in 2012 and 2014. He won reelection by double digits in 2016 and 2018.

On December 11, 2019, Robach announced that he would not run for reelection in 2020.

Post-political career
Currently, Robach hosts a weekly radio show on WYSL.

References

1958 births
Living people
Members of the New York State Assembly
New York (state) Republicans
New York (state) Democrats
New York (state) state senators
People from Greece, New York
21st-century American politicians